High-mobility group protein B2 also known as high-mobility group protein 2 (HMG-2) is a protein that in humans is encoded by the HMGB2 gene.

Function 

This gene encodes a member of the non-histone chromosomal high-mobility group protein family. The proteins of this family are chromatin-associated and ubiquitously distributed in the nucleus of higher eukaryotic cells. In vitro studies have demonstrated that this protein is able to efficiently bend DNA and form DNA circles.  These studies suggest a role in facilitating cooperative interactions between cis-acting proteins by promoting DNA flexibility. This protein was also reported to be involved in the final ligation step in DNA end-joining processes of DNA double-strand breaks repair and V(D)J recombination.

References

Further reading 

 
 
 
 
 
 
 
 
 
 
 
 
 
 
 
 
 
 
  Loss of HMGB2 (High-mobility group protein box 2) during senescence blunts SASP (senescence-associated secretory phenotype) gene expression by allowing for spreading of repressive heterochromatin into SASP gene loci. This correlates with incorporation of SASP gene loci into SAHF (senescence-associated heterochromatin foci), which in turn represses SASP gene expression

External links 
 

Transcription factors